Leo Arthur Hoegh (March 30, 1908 – July 15, 2000) was a decorated U.S. Army officer, lawyer, and politician who served as the 33rd governor of Iowa from 1955 to 1957.

His record of public service included important contributions to his home state and to his country. His career in elective office came to an early end, after his willingness to raise taxes to jump-start improvements to Iowa's roads and schools alienated his conservative Republican allies, and handed Democratic gubernatorial nominee Herschel C. Loveless an issue to exploit.

Personal background
Hoegh's grandfather, Nels Peder Hoegh, left a farm in Denmark in 1866 to search for gold in Colorado. He invested much of his newfound fortune in farmland in Audubon County, Iowa, became a community leader, and upon his death left separate farms for each of his thirteen children.

When Leo was born to Nels' son William in 1908, the household spoke Danish, and it was not until Leo attended school that he began to speak English. While his father ran a bank in nearby Elk Horn, Iowa, Leo decided to become a lawyer.  He received a bachelor of arts degree from the University of Iowa in 1929, where he distinguished himself as a captain of the water polo team and as the founding president of Gamma Nu Chapter of Pi Kappa Alpha. He lettered in swimming and was selected for membership in A.F.I., forerunner to the national honor society, Omicron Delta Kappa. As Leo graduated from the University of Iowa College of Law in 1932, his father sold all of his assets in an unsuccessful effort to prevent the Elk Horn bank from failing. Leo started private practice in Chariton, the county seat of Lucas County in south central Iowa.

State legislative career
In 1936, Hoegh was elected as a Republican to the first of his three terms in the Iowa House of Representatives, where he exhibited leadership and rose successively to become Republican Floor Leader and chairman of the Judiciary Committee. He also developed "a solid, orthodox reputation as an unrelenting penny pincher."

World War II service
Hoegh resigned from the Iowa legislature when he was called up for duty as a junior officer in the Iowa National Guard in 1942.  Rising quickly in the U.S. Army, he became a lieutenant colonel and the operations officer for the 104th Infantry Division, nicknamed the Timberwolf Division, and wrote the operations orders that carried the 104th through to the Rhine and into Germany. For his gallant action during World War II, Hoegh received several decorations, including the Bronze Star with cluster, Croix de Guerre with palm, and Legion of Honor.  It was during those months that he first came to the attention of General Dwight D. Eisenhower, then serving as the supreme allied commander.  At war's end, when the 104th linked up with the Soviet forces in Germany, Lieut. Colonel Hoegh was in a group that flew behind the Soviet lines in a Piper Cub to establish liaison with Marshal Ivan Konev's advancing army.  He wrote a history of the division, Timberwolf Tracks.

Post-war activities
After the war, Hoegh returned to Iowa to resume his law practice in Chariton, and was elected to many civic and business leadership posts. Eager to return to public service at a higher level, he ran in the 1948 Republican primary against incumbent Republican Congressman Karl M. LeCompte. LeCompte defeated him by a 2-to-1 margin.

Putting himself at odds with the more conservative factions that controlled the Iowa Republican Party in the decade after the end of the war, Hoegh became an active supporter of Minnesota Governor Harold Stassen in his bid for the 1948 Republican nomination for president, and former General Dwight Eisenhower in his bid for the 1952 Republican nomination for president.

In 1953, he was appointed Iowa Attorney General by Governor William Beardsley, filling a position created by Beardsley's appointment of Robert L. Larson to the Iowa Supreme Court. There, he earned a reputation as a strict law enforcer, especially of Iowa's widely ignored law against sale of liquor by the drink.

One term as Iowa Governor
In 1954, Hoegh was elected Governor of Iowa, winning a close contest over Democrat Clyde Edsel Herring, son of the former Iowa Governor and U.S. Senator, Clyde LaVerne Herring.

As chief executive, he championed the cause of education and orchestrated a major increase in funding for the state universities and the public schools. He also worked to improve the state's mental institutions, changing the focus from custody to caring for and curing the mentally ill. He urged recognition of the union shop, legislative reapportionment to 'reduce the control of rural areas over the cities,' funds to promote industrial expansion, and a reduction in the voting age from 21 to 18. In 1955, he appointed Iowa's first "Commission to Study Discrimination in Employment."  The Commission's report, issued the following year, identified by name the employers and supervisors alleged to have discriminated on the basis of race or religion, and recommended adoption of a state fair employment practices act.

To balance the budget while accomplishing his ambitious agenda, Hoegh sought to increase revenues by more than $31 million, to be collected through proposed increases in the taxes on beer, cigarettes and gasoline, a capital-gains tax and extension of the sales tax to include services. The Republican-controlled General Assembly approved enough tax increases to bring in $22 million a year, and  Hoegh found himself labelled by his Democratic opponents as "High-Tax Hoegh." Meanwhile, his support for a union shop alienated a traditional ally of Iowa Republicans, the Iowa Manufacturers Association, without disturbing labor's allegiance to the Iowa Democratic Party.

In his race for re-election in 1956, Hoegh won the Republican primary but ran behind Democratic opponent Herschel C. Loveless, mayor of Ottumwa, Iowa. Two weeks before his electoral defeat, Time Magazine placed Hoegh's face on its cover. The cover story ended with this prediction:

His principal problem is that he has caught the spirit of an era that is beginning to recognize the need for a resurgence of good local and state government—and. in doing so. he has perhaps stirred his quiet state too much. But if he has gone too far too fast, he can take a governor's small comfort from the conviction that one year—if not this year—his state will forget the anthills and look with satisfaction on the considerable movements of home-grown progressive government.

The rest of his career
Hoegh had hardly left the governor's chair, however, when President Eisenhower named him federal administrator of civil defense in July 1957. One year later, in 1958, Eisenhower appointed Hoegh director of the Office of Civil and Defense Mobilization. He was a member of the National Security Council, and represented the United States at emergency planning meetings of NATO.

After Eisenhower was replaced by John F. Kennedy, Hoegh moved into the private sector, heading the backyard bomb-shelter division of Wonder Building Corporation of Chicago. However, when the Kennedy Administration elected to stress large-scale, community shelters over backyard bunkers, interest for such products waned, and he returned to practicing law.

In 1964, Hoegh moved his law practice to Chipita Park, Colorado, where he practiced until his retirement in 1985.  He died in Colorado Springs, Colorado in 2000, and was interred there at the Evergreen Cemetery.

Many of his ancestors reside in the Danish community of Elk Horn, Iowa and the extended areas of Audubon and Shelby County.

See also
List of Iowa attorneys general
List of governors of Iowa
List of Danish Americans

References

External links
Finding aid for Leo Arthur Hoegh Oral History, Dwight D. Eisenhower Presidential Library

|-

|-

|-

|-

1908 births
2000 deaths
20th-century American politicians
United States Army personnel of World War II
American people of Danish descent
Burials at Evergreen Cemetery (Colorado Springs, Colorado)
Colorado lawyers
Eisenhower administration cabinet members
Republican Party governors of Iowa
Iowa Attorneys General
Iowa lawyers
Recipients of the Legion of Honour
Republican Party members of the Iowa House of Representatives
People from Audubon County, Iowa
People from Chariton, Iowa
People from El Paso County, Colorado
Recipients of the Croix de Guerre 1939–1945 (France)
United States Army officers
University of Iowa College of Law alumni
Colorado Republicans
20th-century American lawyers